A pet harness is equipment consisting of straps of webbing that loop nearly around—that fasten together using side release buckles—the torso of an animal.

These harnesses generally are made to have both a strap on the chest in front of the forelimbs, and a strap around the torso behind the forelimbs, with straps in between connecting these two. Having a D-ring suitable for (pet tags and) a leash to clip to, they are most often used to restrain an animal, but dogs also particularly wear them to assist a person with a disability or haul people and items. There is also the lifting harness for dogs with disabilities, covered in this article.

Some come in different sizes, although many are size-adjustable with tri-glide slides to loosen or shorten the straps’ length. The straps may come in a range of different colors, and some have reflective coating.

History 
Although modern day harnesses are based on the ones used in the equestrian world, they were originally designed for the act of carrying or pulling sleds or heavy loads.

In ancient times, dog harnesses were developed for animal combat, both in attack and defense.

In time of war, harnessed dogs were also used for guard duties, rescue and carrying medical supplies.

After World War 1, the first guide dogs were used, using harnesses developed for wartime purposes, that still provide the freedom of movement for the dogs.

The early twentieth century began to see further development of dog equipment and harnesses.

Variations of the collar, specifically ornamentation and style, reflect the culture, value and role of the harnessed animal throughout the time period.

As a result of an animal rights activists’ campaigns led in the 1990’s,  harnesses increased in popularity among pet owners due to their apparent comfort compared to collars around the neck.

Harnesses for Service Animals

1. Brace and Balance/Mobility Support Harness

As the name indicates, this type of harness is usually used by service dogs who help their owners with mobility and balance tasks. In order to serve this purpose, this type of harness is equipped with a robust handle or a stable pull strap and should be fully ergonomic for both a handler and a dog.

2. Cape Vests

There are no specific requirements about the service dog types that may wear cape vests- they could be large or small breeds and may perform various tasks. Usually, cape vests are put on service dogs in training while they are still young. These vests are typically fitted with straps in the belly and chest area so that they can stay put. There is a variety of sizes and fabrics (cotton, nylon, canvas...etc.).

3. Cape Harness

Cape harnesses are ergonomic and more robust than cape vests. They come in different designs, i.e. equipped with a handle or not. Usually they come with side D-rings so that one can easily add a pull strap to them. One can choose from many colors and sizes. 

4. Pulling Harness

Handlers with impaired mobility often put this type of harness on their service dogs to enable them to pull a wheelchair, move objects (usually heavy) that the handler is unable to move themselves or open/close doors/cupboards. Usually dogs of larger breeds who have a strong physique are able to fulfill these demanding tasks and are more likely to be seen wearing this type of harness. Pulling harnesses are frequently fitted with Y-straps between both front legs of the dog and over his/her shoulders and typically are fastened by a strap around the belly area.

For physical restraint 

The most common use of the pet harness is for physically restraining an animal. When used as such, the harness is worn in conjunction with a leash; one end of the leash has a metal clip that is attached to the ring on the harness, while the other end is typically a loop held by the human. 

While a collar only encircles the neck, harnesses have loops that surround the thorax. This design allows for the distribution of force, which reduces pressure placed on the animal's trachea, and therefore, possesses a significantly lower risk of strangulation. Harnesses also possess a much lesser chance of said animal slipping out than possible if it wears a collar. As such, collars have largely been replaced by harnesses.

Pet clothing frequently sports a properly-placed buttonhole for the D-ring of the harness worn under the garment.

Some harnesses, such as those worn by police dogs, may have a handle so they can be restrained (or lifted) by hand more securely. Such harness (or vest) may bear identification and have bulletproof padding.

Car safety harnesses
Safety harnesses designed for use in an automobile restrain the animal in a car seat using the car's seat belt. These harnesses are marketed as reducing the risk of injury to a pet that is riding in a vehicle during a traffic collision.  The harnesses are also said to keep the pet from distracting the driver, or escaping from a vehicle. The Center for Pet Safety found "a 100-percent failure rate to protect either the consumer or the dog [or other animal]" in a 2013 crash test study of existing car safety harnesses. Since then, several car safety harness have been designed that pass crash tests conducted by the Center for Pet Safety.

Legislation
In 2012, New Jersey became the first US state  to pass a bill that requires dog and cat owners to restrain their animals while traveling in a moving vehicle. Since the bill's passing, all pets not traveling in a crate and not wearing a safety harness can earn the violator a fine of up to $1,000 and/or six months in prison.

How to choose a harness regarding your pet's morphology?

For dogs 
The choice of your dog's harness is the one that respects the dog's morphology and musculature and allows him the greatest freedom of movement. The shoulder joint (number 7) and elbow joint (number 8) should remain free, not restricted in their movement by the harness straps.

Possible benefits for wearing a harness versus a collar 
Intraocular pressure increased significantly from baseline when pressure was applied via a collar but not via a harness. Based on the results of the study, dogs with weak or thin corneas, glaucoma, or conditions for which an increase in IOP could be harmful should wear a harness instead of a collar, especially during exercise or activity.

At what age a pet can wear a harness?  
For safety reasons, it is recommended that a harness be put on an animal when it is at least 2 to 3 months old.  Below this age, the harness could easily disrupt the proper maturation of some of the animal's organs, disrupt its bone growth (especially in the chest area) and even cause malformations.

See also 
 Dog fashion
Dog collar
 Parrot harness

References

Dog sports
Harness